Suzanne is a common female given name that was particularly popular in the United States in the 1950s and 1960s. It remained in the top 200 most popular names in the United States between 1930 and the late 1980s. Form of the Hebrew name שׁוֹשַׁנָּה (Shoshannah). This was derived from the Hebrew word שׁוֹשָׁן (shoshan) meaning "lily" (in modern Hebrew this also means "rose"). However, it has also been regularly used in English speaking countries since before the start of the 20th century. It may also be spelled Susanne, and common diminutives are Sue and Suzy.

Suzanne, Duchess of Bourbon, (1491–1521)
Suzanne Bachelard (1919–2007), French philosopher
Suzanne Beauclerk, Duchess of St Albans (1921–2010), English writer and painter
Suzanne Bianchetti (1889–1936), French film actress
Suzanne Bischoff van Heemskerck (born 1950), Dutch politician
Suzanne Bombardier (1966–1980), American murder victim
Suzanne Bonamici (born 1954), American politician
Suzanne Camelia-Römer (born 1959), Curaçao politician, twice Prime Minister of the Netherlands Antilles
Suzanne Capper (d. 1992), 16-year-old girl from Manchester who was murdered after being tortured and set on fire.
Suzanne Christy (1904–1974), Belgian film actress
Suzanne Clément (born 1969), Canadian actress
Suzanne Cloutier (1923–2003), Canadian actress
Suzanne Collins (born 1962), American television writer and author
Suzanne Crémieux (1895–1976), French politician
Suzanne Crocker, Canadian documentary filmmaker
Suzanne Cryer (born 1967), American actress
Suzanne Curchod (1737–1794), French-Swiss salonist and write
Suzanne D'Mello, Indian singer, songwriter, vocal arranger, lyricist
Suzanne Danco (1911–2000), Belgian soprano
 Suzanne Desan (born 1957), American professor of history
 Suzanne Dechevaux-Dumesnil (1900–1989), French wife of Samuel Beckett
Suzanne Diskeuve (born 1920s), Belgian figure skater
Suzanne Doucet (born 1944), German singer, composer and producer
Suzanne Farrell (born 1945), American ballerina
Suzanne Flon (1918–2005), French film actress and comedian
Suzanne Freriks (born 1984), Dutch volleyball player
Suzanne de Goede (born 1984), Dutch racing cyclist
Suzanne Goldberg (1940–1999), New Zealand artist
Marie-Suzanne Giroust (1734–1772), French painter
Suzanne Harmes (born 1986), Dutch gymnast
Suzanne Hiltermann-Souloumiac (1919–2001), French Resistance member
Suzanne Johnston (born 1958), Australian operatic mezzo-soprano
Suzanne Jovin (1977–1998), German-born American University senior 
Suzanne Kosmas (born 1944), American politician
Suzanne Landau (born 1946), Israeli art museum curator
Suzanne Lapointe (1934–2015), Canadian singer
Suzanne Leclercq (1901–1994), Belgian paleobotanist and paleontologist
Suzanne Lenglen (1899–1938), French tennis player who won 31 Championship titles
Suzanne Lilar (1901–1992), Flemish Belgian essayist, novelist, and playwright
Suzanne Luttikhuis (born 1977), Dutch volleyball player
Suzanne Malveaux (born 1966), American television news reporter
Suzanne Manet (1829–1906), Dutch-born pianist, wife of Édouard Manet
Suzanne Morrow (1930–2006), Canadian figure skater
Suzanne Mubarak (born 1941), First Lady of Egypt from 1981 to 2011
Suzanne Perlman (1922–2020), Hungarian-Dutch visual artist
Suzanne Pleshette (1937–2008), American actress
Suzanne Plesman (born 1971), Dutch field hockey player
Susanne Ringell (born 1955), Finnish writer and actress
Suzanne Rogers (born 1943), former Rockette and now Days of Our Lives star
Suzanne Rutland (born 1946), Australian historian
Suzanne Silvercruys (1898–1973), Belgian-born American sculptor and political activist
Suzanne Somers (born 1946), American actress, author, singer and businesswoman
Suzanne Spaak (1901–1944), Belgian World War II French Resistance operative
Suzanne Tassier (1898-1956), Belgian historian
Suzanne Valadon (1865–1938), French painter
Suzanne van Veen (born 1987), Dutch racing cyclist
Suzanne Vega (born 1959), American singer and songwriter

See also
 Suzann
 Suzanne (disambiguation)
 Susan (given name)
 Susann
 Susanne (given name)
 Susana (given name)
 Susanna (given name)
 Susannah (given name)
 Sanna (name)
 Susie (disambiguation)
 Susy (disambiguation)
 Suzi (disambiguation)
 Suzie (disambiguation)
 Suze (disambiguation)
 Suzy (disambiguation)
 Shoshana

Dutch feminine given names
English feminine given names
French feminine given names
Given names derived from plants or flowers